Veng-lek is a village in Hsi Hseng Township, Taunggyi District, in the Shan State of eastern Burma.  It is located to the south of Tongkaw along the National Highway 5. 
A river runs to the west of the village from north to south.

References

External links
Maplandia World Gazetteer

Populated places in Taunggyi District
Hsi Hseng Township